The 1949 Utah State Aggies football team was an American football team that represented Utah State University in the Skyline Six Conference during the 1949 college football season. In their first season under head coach George Melinkovich, the Aggies compiled a 3–7 record (1–3 against Skyline opponents), finished fifth in the Skyline Six Conference, and were outscored by opponents by a total of 211 to 105.

Prior the 1949 season, Dick Romney retired as Utah State's head football coach after 30 years in the position.

Schedule

References

Utah State
Utah State Aggies football seasons
Utah State Aggies football